Mamadou Thiam (born 20 March 1995) is a Senegalese professional footballer who plays as a forward for Romanian side Universitatea Cluj. He is also a former Senegal U20s international.

Career
In August 2017, Thiam joined Barnsley F.C. from Dijon on a three-year deal. He scored his first goal for Barnsley, a penalty, in a 3–1 win at Millwall on 30 September 2017.

Career statistics

References

External links

1995 births
Living people
Sportspeople from Aubervilliers
Senegalese footballers
Senegal youth international footballers
French footballers
French sportspeople of Senegalese descent
Association football forwards
Dijon FCO players
Clermont Foot players
Barnsley F.C. players
K.V. Oostende players
AS Nancy Lorraine players
FC Universitatea Cluj players
Ligue 2 players
Championnat National 3 players
English Football League players
Belgian Pro League players
Liga I players
Senegalese expatriate footballers
French expatriate footballers
Senegalese expatriate sportspeople in Belgium
French expatriate sportspeople in Belgium
Expatriate footballers in Belgium
Senegalese expatriate sportspeople in England
French expatriate sportspeople in England
Expatriate footballers in England
Senegalese expatriate sportspeople in Romania
French expatriate sportspeople in Romania
Expatriate footballers in Romania
Footballers from Seine-Saint-Denis
Black French sportspeople